The 2005 Canada rugby union tour of France and Romania was a series of matches played in November 2005 in France and Romania by the Canada national rugby union team.

Results

France: 15. Thomas Castaignède, 14. Aurélien Rougerie, 13. David Marty, 12. Yannick Jauzion, 11. Cédric Heymans, 10. Frédéric Michalak, 9. Dimitri Yachvili, 8. Thomas Lièvremont, 7. Rémy Martin, 6. Julien Bonnaire, 5. Jérôme Thion (c), 4. Lionel Nallet, 3. Pieter de Villiers, 2. Sébastien Bruno, 1. Sylvain Marconnet, – Replacements: 16. Raphaël Ibañez, 17. Olivier Milloud, 18. Gregory Lamboley, 19. Yannick Nyanga, 20. Pierre Mignoni, 22. Julien Laharrague – Unused: 21. Yann Delaigue
Canada: 15. Derek Daypuck, 14. Mike Pyke, 13. Ryan Smith, 12. John Cannon, 11. Brodie Henderson, 10. Ed Fairhurst, 9. Morgan Williams (c), 8. Aaron Carpenter, 7. Stan McKeen, 6. Mike Webb, 5. Jamie Cudmore, 4. Mike James, 3. Garth Cooke, 2. Aaron Abrams, 1. Kevin Tkachuk, – Replacements: 16. Mark Lawson, 17. Casey Dunning, 18. Forrest Gainer, 19. Mike Burak, 20. Adam Kleeberger, 21. Matt Weingart, 22. Ryan McWhinney 

Romania: 15. Catalin Fercu, 14. Gabriel Brezoianu, 13. Valentin Maftei, 12. Romeo Gontineac, 11. Ion Teodorescu, 10. Ionut Dimofte, 9. Lucian Sirbu, 8. Ovidiu Tonita, 7. Alex Manta, 6. Florin Corodeanu, 5. Sorin Socol (c), 4. Cristian Petre, 3. Petrisor Toderasc, 2. Marius Tincu, 1. Petru Balan, – Replacements: 16. Marcel Socaciu, 17. Cezar Popescu, 18. Valentin Ursache, 19. Cosmin Ratiu, 20. Dan Vlad, 21. Dan Dumbrava 
Canada: 15. Mike Pyke, 14. Ryan Stewart, 13. Ryan Smith, 12. Ryan McWhinney, 11. Brodie Henderson, 10. Dave Spicer, 9. Morgan Williams (c), 8. Aaron Carpenter , 7. Stan McKeen, 6. Josh Jackson, 5. Scott Hunter, 4. Mike Burak, 3. Garth Cooke, 2.Mark Lawson, 1. Kevin Tkachuk, – Replacements: 16. Aaron Abrams, 17. Casey Dunning, 18. Forrest Gainer, 19. Adam Kleeberger, 21. Dean van Camp – Unused: 20. Matt Weingart, 22. Derek Daypuck

Notes

Canada
tour
Canada national rugby union team tours
tour
Rugby union tour
Rugby union tours of France
Rugby union tours of Romania